William Kirby (21 June 1883 – 3 October 1917), sometimes known as Bill Kirby or 'Sunny Jim' Kirby, was an English professional footballer, who played as an inside left and is best remembered for his time in the Southern League with Portsmouth, for whom he made over 270 appearances in all competitions. He also played in the Football League for hometown club Preston North End.

Career 

Born in Preston, Lancashire, Kirby started his career at Emmanuel Rovers and joined First Division club Preston North End in November 1900. He would not play competitively for Preston until 1911, but the club kept his registration and he spent much of the next decade on loan to Southern League clubs.

After a season at Oswaldtwistle Rovers, Kirby joined Southern League First Division club Swindon Town as a half-back in August 1902. The following season, he joined West Ham United and played mainly as an outside-right, but also made three appearances as a centre-forward. He scored on his debut, against Millwall, and missed just one game that season, the final game against Swindon Town.

After returning to Swindon Town for another season, he moved to Portsmouth, where he would spend the next seven seasons. He was Portsmouth's top scorer in 1906–07, when the club finished as runners-up in the Southern League First Division. By October 1910, he had scored 100 goals and received a £220 benefit from the club. West Ham United In all Kirby scored 81 goals in 224 Southern League appearances, as well as 22 goals in 36 Western League appearances and four in 12 FA Cup outings.

Kirby was re-called by Preston for the 1911–12 season, where he was top scorer and earned a Second Division championship medal.

He then had spells at Exeter City, Merthyr Town and Croydon Common, playing in their last ever match, before spending the 1916–17 season at Brentford.

Military career and death 
Kirby served in the Royal Engineers during the First World War, prior to being invalided out and working at the Royal Arsenal. He re-enlisted in 1917 and saw action with the 6th (Pioneer) Battalion, attached to the East Yorkshire Regiment, at the Battle of Polygon Wood (part of the Battle of Passchendaele). He was killed in action during the offensive in October of that year. He is buried at Bard Cottage Cemetery in West Flanders, Belgium.

Honours 
Preston North End
Football League Second Division: 1912–13

Career statistics

References

1883 births
1917 deaths
English footballers
Footballers from Preston, Lancashire
Brentford F.C. players
English Football League players
Association football inside forwards
Preston North End F.C. players
Oswaldtwistle Rovers F.C. players
Swindon Town F.C. players
West Ham United F.C. players
Portsmouth F.C. players
Exeter City F.C. players
Southern Football League players
Merthyr Town F.C. players
Croydon Common F.C. players
Western Football League players
Military personnel from Preston, Lancashire
Royal Engineers soldiers
British military personnel killed in World War I
British Army personnel of World War I